Flip Top is an album by American trumpeter Ted Curson which has one side recorded in the studio in 1964 at the same sessions that produced Tears for Dolphy and one side recorded live at the Seventh Yugoslavia Jazz Festival in Ljubljana which was first released on the Freedom label in 1977.

Reception

Allmusic awarded the album 4 stars calling it "A recommended and consistently stimulating release".

Track listing
All compositions by Ted Curson except as indicated
 "Searching for the Blues - 7:47
 "Desolation" (Bill Barron) - 8:45
 "Light Blue" (Barron) - 3:43
 "Quicksand" - 6:09
 "Straight Ice" - 4:53
 "Flip Top" - 4:14

Personnel
Ted Curson - trumpet
Bill Barron - tenor saxophone (tracks 1-3)
Herb Bushler - bass (tracks 1-3)
Dick Berk - drums (tracks 1-3)
Zagreb Radio Orchestra conducted by Miljenko Trohaska and arranged by Zita Carno (tracks 4-6)

References

1977 albums
Freedom Records albums
Ted Curson albums